East Hills Shopping Center is an enclosed shopping mall in St. Joseph, Missouri, US. Opened in 1965, the mall currently features J. C. Penney as its only anchor tenant.

History
East Hills Shopping Center was built by Sherman Dreiseszun in 1965 as one of the first malls in the Midwestern United States. Original tenants included Montgomery Ward, J. C. Penney, Safeway Inc., Katz Drug, Woolworth's, and Hirsch Brothers department store. The mall was expanded in 1988, and Dillard's and Sears were added then.

Throughout the 1990s East Hills lost many tenants, including Woolworth's, Sunglass Hut, A&W, and Osco Drug (formerly Katz Drug). Montgomery Ward closed in 2001, when that retail chain declared bankruptcy. By 2005 a locally owned furniture retailer located in that space, and later closed. From 2005 to 2008, Gadzooks, Famous Footwear, Waldenbooks, Lerner New York, Lane Bryant, f.y.e., and Coach House Gifts (a Hallmark retailer) were other tenants to leave East Hills. The mall was renovated extensively throughout 2008 and 2009 with the addition of a food court, and in 2011 Gordmans opened in the former Montgomery Ward space. From 2012 on many other new tenants were announced and opened, including Christopher & Banks, Charlotte Russe, Justice, and Victoria's Secret. Off Broadway Shoes, Charming Charlie, The Children's Place, Fun Run, and Spencer Gifts were also new tenants recruited to East Hills.

In 2014, East Hills Shopping Center gained unexpected attention for a back-to-school ad that went viral on the Internet due to its perceived poor quality.

Later in 2015, Party City opened on the north side of the mall next to J.C.Penney. In May 2017, one of the anchor retailers, Sears, permanently closed its doors. 

In 2018, the mall established an area of smaller shops, located behind Topsy's, called 'The River' which focus on featuring small town businesses and boutiques.

In August 2020, Gordmans permanently closed its doors. The Covid-19 pandemic brought many businesses to a close and on July 27, 2022, it was announced that Dillard's would be closing on August 27, 2022, leaving J.C.Penney as the last remaining anchor store.

References

External links
 Official website

Buildings and structures in St. Joseph, Missouri
Shopping malls in Missouri
Shopping malls established in 1965
Tourist attractions in Buchanan County, Missouri
1965 establishments in Missouri
Internet memes